Hortense (also spelled Hortance, Hortence and Hortanse) Diédhiou (born 19 August 1983) is a Senegalese judoka. She participated in three Olympic games: 2004 in the -52kg event, 2008 at -52kg and 2012 at -57kg. She was the flag bearer of Senegal at the 2012 Summer Olympics opening ceremony. At the 2004 Olympics, she met Frédérique Jossinet who invited her to train in France. Following that recommendation Diédhiou moved to Provence and in 2011 to Paris.

References 

1983 births
Living people
Senegalese female judoka
Olympic judoka of Senegal
Judoka at the 2004 Summer Olympics
Judoka at the 2008 Summer Olympics
Judoka at the 2012 Summer Olympics
Judoka at the 2016 Summer Olympics
People from Ziguinchor
African Games gold medalists for Senegal
African Games medalists in judo
Competitors at the 2007 All-Africa Games
Competitors at the 2011 All-Africa Games
20th-century Senegalese women
21st-century Senegalese women